Fox Lake is a small natural freshwater lake in northern Highlands County, Florida. It is a short distance east of Deer Lake and Luck Lake. Fox Lake is bordered by houses and Fox Lake Road on the west and on the north, east and south by citrus groves. It is surrounded by private property, but two narrow public easements exist that legally allow access to it.

References

Lakes of Highlands County, Florida
Lakes of Florida